Munroe station may refer to:

 Munroe station (MBTA), a disused train station in Lexington, Massachusetts, United States
 Munroe station (PAAC), a light rail station in Pittsburgh, Pennsylvania, United States

See also
 Monroe station (disambiguation)